Ramboll Management Consulting (formerly known as PLS Consult) is an independent company in the Ramboll Group. Ramboll Management Consulting is an international management consultancy firm with close to 600 consultants, making it one of the largest management consultancies in Northern Europe. Their main office is in Copenhagen; they also have offices in Aarhus, Berlin, Hamburg, Bruxelles, Oslo, Stockholm and Helsinki. This is next to the nearly 300 offices the Ramboll Group has across the globe.

Ramboll Management Consulting is considered one of the most important management consultancy firms in Denmark. Surveys from them are daily quoted in news media of every size across Denmark and they are considered a major player in attributing to the public debate.

Ramboll Management Consulting competes with other global consultancies such as McKinsey & Co. and the Boston Consulting Group, as well as other Nordic consultancies.

History 

Ramboll Management was founded in 1968 as the company "Gert Hansen" in Aarhus. In 1981 the company was acquired by "Rambøll and Hannemann" and the name was changed to "PLS Consult A/S". In 1991 the systems department is sold to EDB Gruppen. The traffic department is sold to Kommunedata (KMD), and Managing Director Jens Jørgen Bøvling transfers to KMD along with 25 employees in connection with the divestment. PLS Consult opened their first office outside Denmark in 1991 in Brussels, Belgium. This was followed by an opening of a German office in 2000, the same year the company named was changed to Ramboll Management. Further offices abroad were opened in Sweden 2001 and Norway 2005.

In 2014 Ramboll acquired US-based global consultancy, ENVIRON, adding more than 1,500 environmental and health science specialists in 21 countries.

Ownership 

Ramboll Management Consulting is part of the Ramboll Group, with more than 12,000 employees with nearly 300 offices all over the world.

References

External links 
Ramboll Management Consulting's English homepage

Management consulting firms of Denmark
International management consulting firms